Established in 1920, the Ministry of Justice of Lebanon is one of the ministries of the Lebanese government. The first incarnation of the ministry was the Department of Justice, Property and Endowments which was headed by the Director of Justice. By 1959, the ministry adopted its current name and its objectives of organizing and administering the judiciary of Lebanon had long been underscored by various decrees. Currently, the Ministry of Justice includes the General Directorate, the Courts of Justice and the Administrative Courts. In turn, the Directorate General of the Ministry of Justice includes the following departments:

 Legislature and Consultation
 Body Issues
 Institute of Judicial Studies
 Directorate of Judges and Staff Affairs
 Department of the Bureau
 Directorate of Prisons
 The interest of reform juvenile delinquents

List of ministers
The following is a list of Lebanese officials who served as the minister of justice: 

 Charles Gergie Dabbas (1920–1926) [1st Minister of Justice]
 Najib Abdel Qader Qabbani (1926–1927)
 Shukri Boutros Al Qardahi (1927–1928)
 Naguib Mattia Abu Sawan (1928)
 Bishara Khalil Al Khoury (1928–1930)
 Ahmed Mustafa Al Husseini (1930–1931)
 August Basha Ibrahim Adib (1931–1932)
 Sami Khalil Al Khoury (1932–1937)
 Khairuddin Saeed Al Ahdab (1937–1938)
 Abdullah Aref Al-Yafi (1938)
 Khaled Najib Shehab (1938–1941)
 Philip Naguib Paul (1941–1943)
 Habib Salim Abi Shahla (1943)
 Ayoub Girgis Tabet (1943–1945)
 Saadi Mohammed Al Manala (1945)
 Henry Philippe Pharaoh (1945)
 Salim Habib Takla (1945)
 Riad Reda Solh (1948–1951)
 Rashid Abdul Hamid Karami (1951)
 Paul Halim Fayyad (1951)
 Basil Najib Trad (1951)
 Mousa Melhem Mubarak (1952)
 Fouad Girgis Al-Khoury (1952–1953)
 Bashir Mahmoud Al Awar (1953–1954)
 Alfred George (1954)
 Muhieddin Zakaria Al-Nasali (1954)
 Charles Iskandar Helou (1954–1955)
 Fouad Nicolas Ghosn (1955)
 Gabriel Asaad Murr (1955–1956)
 Sami Abdel Rahim Solh (1956)
 Salim Nassib Lahoud (1956–1957)
 Emile Dawood Tian (1957–1958)
 Hussein Ahmed Al Owaini (1958)
 Yousef Hanna Al–Suda (1958–1960)
 Nasim Michael Majdalani (1960)
 Gibran Caesar Nahas (1960–1961)
 Fouad Gergi Boutros (1961–1966)
 Philip Habib Takla (1966–1968)
 Majid Tawfiq Arslan (1968)
 Suleiman Qablan Franjieh (1968)
 Rashid Youssef Beydoun (1968–1969)
 Adel Abdullah Osairan (1969)
 Shafiq Dib Al Wazzan (1969–1970)
 Jamil Rachid Kabbi (1970–1973)
 Kazem Ismail Khalil (1973–1975)
 Nour al-Din al-Rifai (1975–1976)
 Farid Elias Rufail (1976–1979)
 Khashik Diran Babikian (1980–1982)
 Roger Nicolas Shaikhani (1982–1984)
 Nabih Mustafa Berri (1984–1988)
 Lotfi Haider Jaber (1988–1989)
 Edmon Amin Rizk (1989–1992)
 Bahij Bahij Tabbara (1992)
 Nasri Suleiman Al-Maalouf (1992–1998)
 Joseph Elias Shaoul (1998–2000)
 Samir Adnan Al Jisr (2000–2004)
 Adnan Mohamed Addoum (2004–2005)
 Charles Elias Rizk (2005)
 Khaled Mohieddin Qabbani (2005–2008)
 Ibrahim Albert Najjar (2008–2011)
 Shakib Wadih Kortbawi (2011–2014)
 Ashraf Ahmed Rifi (2014–2016)
 Salim Jean Jreissati (2016–2019)
 Albert Serhan (2019–2020)
 Marie-Claude Najm (2020–2021)

See also 

 Justice ministry
 Politics of Lebanon

References 

Justice
Lebanon